Berlin-Grünau is a railway station in the Treptow-Köpenick district of Berlin.

Grünau is the terminus for off-peak  trains (during peak times  trains continue to Wildau) and the peak-time terminus for line  (off-peak trains terminate at Schöneweide).

References

Berlin S-Bahn stations
Railway stations in Treptow-Köpenick
Railway stations in Germany opened in 1866
1866 establishments in Prussia